"I Don't Wanna" is a song by English punk rock band Sham 69, which was released as the band's debut single on 28 October 1977. It was their only release on independent label Step Forward Records before signing with Polydor, and was successful on the independent chart. Two B-side tracks, "Ulster" and "Red London" appear on the single. "I Don't Wanna" was written by frontman Jimmy Pursey and guitarist Dave Parsons and produced by John Cale, a founding and former member of experimental rock band The Velvet Underground. The songs were recorded in August 1977 at Pathway Studios in London. Jill Furmanovsky took the cover photograph.

Track listing 
Side one 
 "I Don't Wanna" (Jimmy Pursey, Dave Parsons) – 1:46
Side two
 "Ulster" (Jimmy Pursey, Dave Parsons) – 2:40
 "Red London" (Dave Parsons) – 1:55

Production credits 
 Producer: John Cale
 Musicians:
 Jimmy Pursey – singer
 David Parsons – guitar
 Albie Maskell – bass guitar
 Mark Cain – drums

References 

Sham 69 songs
1977 debut singles
Song recordings produced by John Cale
1977 songs
Songs written by Dave Guy Parsons
Songs written by Jimmy Pursey